The Albatros C.III was a German two-seat general-purpose biplane of World War I, built by Albatros Flugzeugwerke. The C.III was a refined version of the successful Albatros C.I and was eventually produced in greater numbers than any other C-type Albatros.

Use
The C.III was used in a wide variety of roles including observation, photo-reconnaissance, light bombing and bomber escort. First twelve aircraft went to the front in December 1915. The biggest number was available on the front in August 1916 – 354. They were mostly withdrawn from frontline service by mid-1917, although the production continued for training. Orders for 2271 aircraft in total are known.

Eighteen C.IIIs were delivered in August 1916 to Bulgaria. They were destroyed in 1920 in accordance with the Treaty of Neuilly-sur-Seine. According to other sources, 26 Albatros C.III were delivered to Bulgaria, including eight trainers.

Polish Air Force operated 15 Albatros C.III in 1918-1920 during Polish-Soviet War.

Construction
Like the Albatros C.I, the C.III was a popular aircraft with rugged construction and viceless handling. The most prominent difference between the two was the revised vertical stabilizer.  The C.III had a lower, rounded tail compared to the large, triangular tail of the C.I, which, combined with smaller weight, gave the C.III greater agility. The power plant was either a 110 kW (150 hp) Benz Bz. III or a 120 kW (160 hp) Mercedes D.III inline engine and, like numerous other two-seaters used during the war (such as the British Royal Aircraft Factory R.E.8) the cylinder head and exhaust manifold protruded above the front fuselage, limiting the pilot's forward visibility.

The observer, who occupied the rear cockpit, was armed with a single 7.92 mm (0.312 in) Parabellum MG14 machine gun. C.III aircraft were typically fitted with a gun synchronizer and a single forward-firing 7.92 mm (0.312 in) LMG 08/15 machine gun. The C.III could also carry a bomb load of up to 90 kg (200 lb) in four vertical tubes in the fuselage or external racks.

Between 1926 and 1927, two Mercedes D.III engined copies were built from saved parts and components of the destroyed aircraft by Bulgarian state aircraft workshops DAR as the DAR 2 for use as trainers. According to D. Nedialkov, twelve DAR-2 were built (at least nine are confirmed by a photograph). Three C.III's were built in 1927-1928 at Lithuanian Karo Aviacijos dirbtuvės (Military Aviation Workshop) in Kaunas.

Operators

Bulgarian Air Force (including DAR-2)

Finnish Air Force

Luftstreitkräfte
Marine Flieger-Abteilung

Latvian Air Force

Lithuanian Air Force (12 bought and 3 built)

Polish Air Force (15 used)

Ottoman Air Force (No AK 8 to AK 41)

Austro-Hungarian Air Force

Variants
Data from
Some 4% faster. Limited production.

W.2 Seaplane variant with twin floats, modified Mercedes D.II installation, revised cabane strut and a much larger fin. Parabellum MG14 machine gun in observer's cockpit. One only, delivered June 1916.

Specifications (C.III)

See also

References

Bibliography

Further reading
 
 

Biplanes
Single-engined tractor aircraft
1910s German bomber aircraft
1910s German military reconnaissance aircraft
Military aircraft of World War I
C.03
Aircraft first flown in 1915